Lal Kitab (Hindi: लाल किताब, Urdu: , literally Red Book) is a set of five books on Vedic astrology and palmistry, written in Hindi and later, in the Urdu script too.

Poetic verses with philosophy and hidden nuances form the core farmanns or upaya (remedy recommended) of the book. It has led to field of remedial astrology known as Lal Kitab remedies, that is simple remedies for various planetary afflictions in the horoscope or birth chart, which have over the years become part of the folk traditions of the region, that includes North India and Pakistan.

Authorship & the practitioners of today
Although, the author of the original verses is unknown or a matter of debate, however, Pandit Roop Chand Joshi (1898-1982) of Punjab, who authored the presently available version during the years 1939 to 1952 in five volumes, is regarded as the master of this science. Some regard him also as originator of this books or
The names of the five set of books authored by Pt. Roop Chand Joshi, together called as Lal Kitab with their years of publication, are as follows.
A copy of first book published in 1939 is preserved in Lahore Museum. :-

 Lal Kitab Ke Farman (The Edicts of Lal Kitab), 1939, 383 pages
 Lal Kitab Ke Arman (Ilm Samudrik Kee Lal Kitab Ke Armaan), (The “Aspirations” of Lal Kitab), 1940, 280 pages
 Gutka (Ilm Samudrik Kee Lal Kitab) (Third Part), 1941, 428 pages
 Lal Kitab Ke Farman (Lal Kitab – Tarmeem Shuda), 1942, 384 pages
 Ilm-e Samudrik ki buniyad par ki Lalkitab (Lal Kitab), 1952, 1173 pages

Contents
Lal Kitab is unique in field of vedic astrology because for the first time a book explained how certain planetary positions in one's horoscope should also reflect in the lines of his palm. In other word the book is on astro-palmistry, that is, it has mixed the two different arts of Palmistry and Jyotisha a.k.a. Hindu astrology together.

The books were published in red hard-cover. In Hindi and Urdu languages Lal means the color red and Kitab means a book. Further, in India traditionally, business ledger books are bound in red color. Also red color in Hindu religion is considered to be very auspicious and as symbol of Ganesha and Lakshmi. The red kum-kum is essential in all auspicious occasion and Hindu religious rites. The Lal Kitab volumes were also given a red binding because these books contain duniyavi hisaab kitaab ( the ledger book of one’s life).  In fact, Lal Kitab mandates in very clear terms, that any book dealing with this system must be bound in non-shining, red color.

For the first time in the history of astrology, Lal Kitab introduced a new style of horoscope analysis with quick and affordable remedies, which were devoid of remedies like pooja and wearing of gemstones, generally recommended by other branches of Vedic astrology and Jyotisha.

In present days, there are many followers of Lal Kitab. In India and abroad one can find many practitioners of Lal Kitab, prescribing remedies as per farmanns of these books. There are many people, who claim to have benefited from the remedies of these books. The mass followers of Lal Kitab are increasing everyday and this science has become very popular in present days throughout different parts of world.

The book has been popular in both India and Pakistan, many of its astrological remedies upaya or farmans have become part of every day culture in the subcontinent, like throwing coins into a river while passing over it, feeding grass to cow, bread to a dog and offering meals to unmarried girls etc.

Cultural influences
The book has been popular in both India and Pakistan, many of its astrological remedies upaya or farmans have become part of every day culture in the subcontinent, like throwing coins into a river while passing over it, feeding grass to cow, bread to a dog and offering meals to unmarried girls etc. Some of its farmans have become proverbs, in languages as diverse as Multani language.

See also
 Hindu astrology
 Jyotihshastra
 Vastu shastra

References

Bibliography
 Lal Kitab: System Of Progression And Curative Measure, by R. S. Chillar. Sagar Publications, 2004. .

External links
 https://www.lalkitab.info/
More Information
 Lal Kitab in PDF format. All India Federation of Astrologers Societies
 http://www.lalqitab.com
Which Lal Kitab book should we read?
Kundali Matching.Lal Kitab Predictions
Read online Lal Kitab in hindi

Hindu astrological texts
Urdu-language books